Lyford is a city in Willacy County, Texas. The population was 2,611 at the 2010 census. It may be included as part of the Brownsville–Harlingen–Raymondville and the Matamoros–Brownsville metropolitan areas.

Geography

Lyford is located at 26°24'40" North, 97°47'24" West (26.411247, –97.789939).

According to the United States Census Bureau in 2000, the city has a total area of 1.1 square miles (2.8 km), of which, 1.1 square miles (2.8 km) of it is land and 0.93% is water. Prior to the 2010 census, the city gained area by annexing the Bausell and Ellis CDP and part of the Lyford South CDP.

Demographics

2020 census

As of the 2020 United States census, there were 2,249 people, 656 households, and 529 families residing in the city.

2000 census
As of the census of 2000, there were 1,973 people, 562 households, and 472 families residing in the city. The population density was 1,844.5 people per square mile (711.9/km). There were 614 housing units at an average density of 574.0 per square mile (221.6/km). The racial makeup of the city was 63.20% White, 0.35% African American, 0.41% Native American, 0.00% Asian, 0.00% Pacific Islander, 33.05% from other races, and 2.99% from two or more races. 92.85% of the population were Hispanic or Latino of any race.

There were 562 households, out of which 49.1% had children under the age of 18 living with them, 64.9% were married couples living together, 16.4% had a female householder with no husband present, and 16.0% were non-families. 14.1% of all households were made up of individuals, and 8.7% had someone living alone who was 65 years of age or older. The average household size was 3.51 and the average family size was 3.89.

In the city, the population was spread out, with 34.0% under the age of 18, 10.4% from 18 to 24, 26.0% from 25 to 44, 18.4% from 45 to 64, and 11.3% who were 65 years of age or older. The median age was 30 years. For every 100 females, there were 87.5 males. For every 100 females age 18 and over, there were 83.3 males.

The median income for a household in the city was $25,521, and the median income for a family was $26,985. Males had a median income of $19,511 versus $16,827 for females. The per capita income for the city was $8,684. 30.6% of the population and 27.7% of families were below the poverty line. 34.2% of those under the age of 18 and 38.2% of those 65 and older were living below the poverty line.

Government and infrastructure
The United States Postal Service operates the Lyford Post Office.

Education 
Lyford's public schools are operated by the Lyford Consolidated Independent School District.

Economy

Lyford's economic fortunes have been linked intimately with that of Mexico's after NAFTA went into effect on January 1, 1994. Prior to ratification of this agreement, economic activity in Lyford was centered on agriculture. Since then economic activity has diversified with the opening of a second convenience store.

In addition to the industrial activity, there is a retail sector that is dependent on purchases made by wealthy and middle-class Mexican consumers from Monterrey (connected to Reynosa by toll road) and Tampico. According to Cynthia Brown, director of UTPA's Center for Border Economic Studies, Mexicans invested $1.4 billion into the economy and paid for 41,000 jobs[1]. In 2003, the Rio Grande Valley showed a 13.3 percent increase from 2002 sales, topping $10 billion according to a report compiled by the Rio Grande Valley Partnership/Chamber of Commerce.

References

External links 
 Handbook of Texas Online

Cities in Texas
Cities in Willacy County, Texas